The discography of Japanese R&B and pop singer Ken Hirai consists of ten studio albums, two compilation albums, one remix album, three cover albums, thirteen video albums and numerous singles and promotional singles. Hirai debuted as a musician under Sony Music Records in 1995 with the single "Precious Junk", but found success five years later with the single "Lakuen" and his third album, The Changing Same.

Hirai's success continued through the 2000s, with the single "Ōki na Furudokei" (2002), a Japanese-language version of "My Grandfather's Clock", an 1876 song by American composer Henry Clay Work, "Hitomi o Tojite" (2004), the theme song for the film Crying Out Love, In the Center of the World and "Pop Star" (2005), the theme song of the Misaki Ito-starring drama Kiken na Aneki.

In addition to his studio albums, Hirai has released a series of acoustic cover albums entitled Ken's Bar, named after a series of concept live concerts he performs.

Studio albums
All release dates pertain to their release in Japan, unless stated.

Compilation albums

Remix album

Cover albums

Singles

Promotional singles

Video albums

Music video collections

Live concerts

Other appearances

Notes

References

Discographies of Japanese artists
Pop music discographies
Rhythm and blues discographies